The Lowe's shrew (Chodsigoa parca) is a species of mammal in the family Soricidae. It is found in China, Myanmar, Thailand, and Vietnam.

References

 Insectivore Specialist Group 1996.  Soriculus parca.   2006 IUCN Red List of Threatened Species.   Downloaded on 30 July 2007.

Red-toothed shrews
Taxonomy articles created by Polbot
Taxa named by Glover Morrill Allen
Mammals described in 1923